Far Lands or Bust (abbreviated FLoB) is an online video series created by Kurt J. Mac in which he plays the video game Minecraft. The series depicts his journey to the "Far Lands", a distant area of a Minecraft world in which the terrain generation does not function correctly, creating a warped landscape.

Episodes of Far Lands or Bust typically act as a sort of podcast, with the game providing a backing track while Kurt discusses recent events in his life, news and science. The show also encourages viewers to donate to charity to reach fundraising goals. This charity was originally Child's Play, for which the show raised over $400,000. From 2018 to 2019 the charity was Direct Relief. Beginning in 2020 the charity is the Progressive Animal Welfare Society (PAWS), from which Kurt adopted his own dog, Juno, in 2017. On August 30, 2020, Kurt announced he would no longer be using PAWS as his charity, mostly due to complications with their donation system, instead switching the charity to the Equal Justice Initiative.

Format

The Far Lands 
Minecraft is a sandbox video game which places players in a 3D procedurally generated world. As a player walks in any direction, the game generates terrain ahead of them, creating (in theory) a virtually infinite world for the player to explore. However, due to computational limits in earlier versions of the game, at a distance of roughly 12,550,821 blocks from the center of the world the terrain generation algorithm behaves unexpectedly, creating a sudden warped landscape. Markus Persson, the original developer of Minecraft, commented that "Walking that far will take a very long time. Besides, the bugs add mystery and charisma to the Far Lands." The name "Far Lands" was adopted by the community to refer to this area. Persson also said it would be "impossible to reach the Far Lands" and Kurt took that as a challenge.

Kurt has continued to record his series in version Beta 1.7.3, the latest version of the game in which the Far Lands are still present. Persson estimated in 2014 that walking to the Far Lands would take approximately 800 hours. Even further out (32 million blocks), the game fails to check for collision, leading the player to fall through the map to their death. In August 2022, this goal was reached for the first time by another player, Mystical Midget, after 2,500 hours of walking.

F3 Monuments 
In the game, a debug screen can be opened by pressing F3, which displays the player's current coordinates in the world, plus the biome. In Kurt's journey to the Far Lands, he only presses F3 once the season's charity donations goal has been met to wrap up the season. Additionally, he builds a monument to commemorate the occasion.

One exception to this was when he crossed a point where the floating-point error grew from two texture pixels to four. On August 8, 2020, due to witnessing an increase in the floating-point error jitter, Kurt pressed F3 during a live stream (listed as episode 793.5) to confirm he'd hit the milestone of 4,194,304 blocks. In the next episode, 794, on August 11, 2020, he built a monument to mark the point.

Notes 
1.Initially $820, but raised to $8,200 after goal was reached in under a week

References

External links

Charity fundraisers
YouTube channels launched in 2010
2010s YouTube series
2020s YouTube series
Minecraft
Gaming-related YouTube channels
2011 web series debuts